Jean-Claude La Marre is a Haitian-American actor, writer, and director. His acting credits include the films Malcolm X and Dead Presidents. On television, he has guest-starred on New York Undercover, Law & Order, and NYPD Blue. He is also the writer and director of the independent films Gang of Roses and Go for Broke.

Early life and education
La Marre was born in Brooklyn and earned a Bachelor of Arts degree in political science from Brooklyn College. At 22 years old, he served as chairman of the University Student Senate at the City College of New York. LaMarre also won the 1992 National Collegiate debate tournament held in Boulder, Colorado. He was discovered by Spike Lee at a commencement brunch. He is an American of Haitian descent.

Career
In 1994, La Marre appeared as Jake in Fresh. La Marre's Color of the Cross, is a film that portrays Jesus as a black man, and implies that Christ's persecution was a racially-motivated hate crime. His directorial debut was the film Higher Ed.

In 2007, LaMarre set up a distribution output deal for his film label, Nulite Media Group. During the period, he was credited for releasing over 60 feature films. Among the films released through the label are the revisionist western, Gang of Roses, Trapped: Haitian Nights, Broom Wedding, and Nora's Hair Salon, with a cameo by Whitney Houston in the film. In 2017, he wrote and directed "Kinky", a 50 Shades of Grey-esque erotic thriller. The film as released on 700 screens around the country.
In 2018, he wrote and directed the upcoming film "Gangland" with singer Tamar Braxton and actors Wood Harris and Clifton Powell.

Filmography

Film

Television

References

External links

Living people
American male film actors
American television producers
American film producers
American male screenwriters
American film directors
American male television actors
American people of Haitian descent
1973 births